The 2009 Pan American Junior Championships were held in Port of Spain, Trinidad and Tobago at the Hasely Crawford Stadium on July 31 to August 2, 2009. A report on the
results was given.

Participation (unofficial)

Detailed result lists can be found.  An unofficial count yields the number of about 397
athletes from about 32 countries:  Argentina (10), Aruba (1), Bahamas (13), Barbados (5), Bermuda (8), Bolivia
(1), Brazil (34), British Virgin Islands (6), Canada (51), Chile (11),
Colombia (9), Costa Rica (10), Cuba (6), Dominican Republic (12), El Salvador
(3), Grenada (5), Guyana (6), Jamaica (27), Mexico (23), Netherlands Antilles
(3), Panama (2), Paraguay (1), Peru (1), Puerto Rico (9), Saint Kitts and
Nevis (9), Saint Lucia (3), Saint Vincent and the Grenadines (2), Suriname
(1), Trinidad and Tobago (32), Turks and Caicos (2), United States (82),
Venezuela (9).

Medal summary
Complete results can be found Complete results can be found on the Athletics Canada website, on the C.F.P.I. Timing website, on the USA Track & Field website, on the Tilastopaja website, and on the "World Junior Athletics History"
website.

Men

Women

Medal table

The medal count has been published.

References

External links
Official results
World Junior Athletics History

Pan American
Pan American
Pan American U20 Athletics Championships
2009 in Caribbean sport
Athletics competitions in the Caribbean
International athletics competitions hosted by Trinidad and Tobago
2009 in youth sport